An annular solar eclipse occurred on January 14, 1945. A solar eclipse occurs when the Moon passes between Earth and the Sun, thereby totally or partly obscuring the image of the Sun for a viewer on Earth. An annular solar eclipse occurs when the Moon's apparent diameter is smaller than the Sun's, blocking most of the Sun's light and causing the Sun to look like an annulus (ring). An annular eclipse appears as a partial eclipse over a region of the Earth thousands of kilometres wide. Annularity was visible from Eastern Cape in South Africa, and northeastern Tasmania Island and Furneaux Group in Australia.

Related eclipses

Solar eclipses 1942–1946

Saros 140 

It is a part of Saros cycle 140, repeating every 18 years, 11 days, containing 71 events. The series started with partial solar eclipse on April 16, 1512. It contains total eclipses from July 21, 1656 through November 9, 1836, hybrid eclipses from November 20, 1854 through December 23, 1908, and annular eclipses from January 3, 1927 through December 7, 2485. The series ends at member 71 as a partial eclipse on June 1, 2774. The longest duration of totality was 4 minutes, 10 seconds on August 12, 1692.

Notes

References

1945 1 14
1945 in science
1945 1 14
January 1945 events